Henry Harding also known as Pattington Papa Nii Papafio or Oesophagus is a Ghanaian film actor. He is best known for the role he played in the Taxi Driver TV series using a large vocabulary.

Education 
He started his basic education at St. Martins Preparatory, Mamprobi in Accra, then he continued to Bagabaga Middle School in Tamale then he did his O'Level at Ofori Panyin in the Eastern Region and then A-Levels at St. Johns in Sekondi.

Career 
During his acting career he was also a broadcaster at GBC doing sports beats and also have worked with Happy Fm (Ghana) and ETV Ghana doing sports. He now been ordained as a pastor at the Lifted Yoke Chapel at Korle Gonno.

Filmography 
List of movies:

 Taxi Driver
 Adults in Education
 Dada Boat
 Hotel St. James
 Home Sweet Home
 The Arthurs
 The Adoteys
 Multi Kolour

References 

Ghanaian male actors
Year of birth missing (living people)
Living people